is a subway station in Chiyoda, Tokyo, Japan, operated by the Tokyo subway operator Tokyo Metro. It is located adjacent to the National Diet Building.

The station name literally means "in front of the National Diet Building".

Lines
Kokkai-gijidomae Station is served by the following lines.
Tokyo Metro Marunouchi Line (M-14)
Tokyo Metro Chiyoda Line (C-07)

The station is also connected by underground passageways to Tameike-sannō Station, which is served by the Ginza and s, and it is possible to transfer between the two stations without passing through the ticket gates.

Station layout

History

The station first opened on March 15, 1959, as a station on the Marunouchi Line. The Chiyoda Line platforms opened on October 20, 1972. It also became possible to transfer to the Ginza and Namboku lines via a passageway to the newly opened Tameike-Sannō Station which opened on September 30, 1997.

The station facilities were inherited by Tokyo Metro after the privatization of the Teito Rapid Transit Authority (TRTA) in 2004.

Surrounding area
 National Diet Building
 Prime Minister's Official Residence (Japan)
 Cabinet Office
 Hibiya High School
 Hie Shrine
The Capitol Hotel Tokyu

References

External links
 Kokkai-gijidomae Station information (Tokyo Metro) 

Railway stations in Tokyo
Stations of Tokyo Metro
Tokyo Metro Marunouchi Line
Tokyo Metro Chiyoda Line
Railway stations in Japan opened in 1959